The 1982 Thomas Cup was the 12th tournament of Thomas Cup, the most important men's badminton team competition in the world. The final round was held in London, England.

China won its first title after beating Indonesia in the final round.

Teams
26 teams from 4 regions took part in the competition. As defending champion, Indonesia skipped the Qualifications and the first round, and played directly in the second round at the Inter-Zone Ties.

Australasian zone

Asian zone
Western section

Eastern section

European zone

Panamerican zone

Qualification ties

Australasian zone

Asian zone

European zone

Panamerican zone

Inter-zone ties
The Inter-Zone Ties were played between May 10 and May 21, 1982, in England.

First round

Semi-finals

Final

References

External links
 tangkis.tripod.com
 Mike's Badminton Populorum 

Thomas Cup
Thomas Cup
Thomas & Uber Cup
1982 in English sport